Umm Safa/Kafr Ishwa or Um Al-Safa is a Palestinian village in the Ramallah and al-Bireh Governorate.

Location 
It is bordered by 'Ajjul and 'Atara  to the east, Deir as Sudan and Ajjul  to the north, Nabi Salih and Deir Nidham to the west, and Jibiya, Burham  and Kobar  to the south.

Important Bird Area
A largely forested 3,500 ha site in the vicinity of the villages of Umm Safa and Nabi Salih has been recognised as an Important Bird Area (IBA) by BirdLife International because it supports a population of lesser spotted eagles.

History 
It has been suggested that this was "apparently  connected with an ancient Ishvah or Mizpeh,"  but this does not agree with modern archaeology.

Ceramic remains from the Byzantine era have been found here, as have  sherds from the Crusader/Ayyubid and  Mamluk eras.

Ottoman era
Pottery sherds from the early Ottoman era have also been found here, and it was mentioned in the sixteenth hundreds tax records under the name of Kafr Shu.

In 1838 Um Safah  was noted as a Muslim village the Beni Zaid district.

In 1870, Victor Guérin climbed up on the hilltop which Umm Safa occupied, and found that the village had about 300 inhabitants. He further noted that: "It must go back to an ancient site as is shown by the materials used in the building of some houses and several columnar sections scattered about the ground. A copious spring, called Ain Umm Safa, provides the villagers with water. They venerate, under a koubbeh, the remains of Nabi Hanan."  An official Ottoman village list from about the same year, 1870, listed Kefr  Eschwa as having 24 houses and a  population of 120, though the population count included men, only. It was noted as being located north of  Dschibija.

In 1882 the PEF's Survey of Western Palestine (SWP) described  Umm Suffah (also called Kefr Ishwah) as "a village on high ground on the Roman road to Antipatris. It contains a small mosque or Moslem chapel, and has a well to the north."

British Mandate era
In the  1922 census of Palestine,  conducted by the British Mandate authorities, Umm Sufa  had a population of 80 Muslims, increasing in the 1931 census  to 89 Muslims, in 27 houses in Umm Safah (or Kafr Ishwa).

In the  1945 statistics, the population of Umm Safa (Kafr Ishwa) was 110 Muslims,  while the total land area was 4,083  dunams, according to an official land and population survey. Of  this,  1,364 dunums were used   for plantations and irrigable land, 821  for cereals, while 17 dunams were classified as built-up areas.

Jordanian era
In the wake of the 1948 Arab–Israeli War, and after the 1949 Armistice Agreements, Umm Safa  came  under Jordanian rule.

The Jordanian census of 1961 found 252 inhabitants in Umm Safa.

1967-present
Since the Six-Day War in 1967, Umm Safa  has been under Israeli occupation.

After  the 1995 accords, 16% of village land has been defined as Area B land, while the remaining 84% is Area C. Israel has confiscated a total of 227 dunams of land from the village in order to construct two Israeli settlements: Ateret and Hallamish.

The village have two tombs within it.

References

Bibliography

 
 
 

  
  (Kefr Achoua (p.  39) ..mentioned in Socin)

External links  
Welcome To Umm Safa
 Umm Safa Welcome to Palestine
Survey of Western Palestine, Map 14: IAA, Wikimedia commons
 Umm Safa Village (Fact Sheet),  Applied Research Institute–Jerusalem (ARIJ)
 Umm Safa Village Profile, ARIJ
Umm Safa Aerial photo, ARIJ
Locality Development Priorities and Needs in Umm Safa Village, ARIJ

Ramallah and al-Bireh Governorate
Municipalities of the State of Palestine
Important Bird Areas of the State of Palestine